Guglielmo Scilla (Rome, 26 November 1987) is an Italian web content creator, actor, and radio personality.

He became popular as Willwoosh thanks to his YouTube channel.

Scilla is openly gay.

Filmography

Films

Television

Web

Music videos

Stage

Books 
L'inganno della morte (Kowalski editore, 2013)
10 regole per fare innamorare with Alessia Pelonzi (Kowalski editore, 2012)

References

External links
 
 Guglielmo Scilla biografia (in Italian)

1987 births
Living people
Italian male television actors
Italian male film actors
Male actors from Rome
Italian gay writers
Italian gay actors